R.O.S.E. is the fourth studio album by English singer-songwriter Jessie J. It was released by Republic Records in four parts, starting on 22 May 2018, and finishing on 25 May 2018, with a part being released on each day. The four parts released are R (Realisations), O (Obsessions), S (Sex) and E (Empowerment). Jessie co-wrote the album and worked with producers such as DJ Camper and Kuk Harrell.

The songs "Real Deal", "Think About That", "Not My Ex" and "Queen" were released as singles before the release of the album. Jessie J promoted the album with the R.O.S.E Tour (2017–2018) performing songs from the album and some of her signature hits.

Background
Following the release of Jessie J's previous album, Sweet Talker, she began to have difficulty with writing and creating new music. In an interview with Billboard, she stated "I wasn't enjoying the music I was making as much as I should. I wasn't writing because I didn't want to make music that escaped me from that. I wanted to make music that put me in the feeling. But to do that I had to be really strong; to know that I wasn't going to be able to be pushed and fall over. That's why it took me a long time. I don't feel that I've ever learned so much about myself at any other time in my life." After some time off working with DJ Camper, Jessie J became inspired to write again. "[DJ Camper] put the 'Think About That' beat on repeat before going outside for a break. I called him a dickhead because I still didn't feel creative yet. I hadn't really written a song for two years, just some poetry. But as I sat there and listened to the beat, words started to come out". When talking about the singles, "Think About That" and "Not My Ex" with Jack White from the UK Charts Company, Jessie described them as "a new energy". While talking about the acronyms of the album's title, Jessie said that "Those four words were what I kept coming back to, that everything I was writing about could fall into. I wrote [R.O.S.E.] out and then thought 'shit, my mum's name is Rose' and it came naturally like that."

Critical reception

Renowned for Sound awarded R.O.S.E. 3.5 out of 5 stars, with Rachael Scarsbrook stating that "splitting an album into four chunks is a brave move for a popstar, in a genre when fans are a little more casual and expect everything to be delivered to them in one all consuming format. That said, R.O.S.E. feels like Jessie J almost fully rejecting her more mainstream appeal in order to put out a collection of tracks that mean a great deal to her on a more personal level. It might not be the kind of thing I normally go for, but as a project it’s actually quite skilled and enjoyable."

Promotion
In August 2017, Jessie teamed up with M&M's to promote her single "Real Deal". In the following months, she released "Think About That", "Not My Ex" and "Queen" as follow-up singles from R.O.S.E.

R.O.S.E Tour 2017–2018
On 15 September 2017, Jessie J announced a worldwide run of intimate shows. On 20 September 2017 an extra date was added in London at the Shepherd's Bush Empire. Jessie J continued to add more dates through 2018 supporting R.O.S.E.

Track listing
All tracks written by Jessica Cornish and Darhyl Camper, except where noted.

Personnel
Credits adapted from Tidal.

Performance
 Jessica Cornish – vocals, background vocals, songwriting
 Darhyl Camper – songwriting
 Shuggie Otis – songwriting
 Jerry Fuller – songwriting
 David Foster – songwriting
 Cheryl Lynn – songwriting
 David Paich – songwriting

Technical
 Darhyl Camper – programming, production
 Kuk Harrell – production
 Hitmaka – production
 Bongo ByTheWay – production
 Simone Torres – engineering
 Sauce Miyagi – engineering
 Jaycen Joshua – mixing
 David Nakaji – mixing assistance
 Iván Jiménez – mixing assistance
 Maddox Chimm – mixing assistance

Release history

References

2018 albums
Jessie J albums
Lava Records albums
Republic Records albums